Feels Good Man is a 2020 American documentary film about the Internet meme Pepe the Frog. Marking the directorial debut of Arthur Jones, the film stars artist Matt Furie, the creator of Pepe. The film follows Furie as he struggles to reclaim control of Pepe from members of the alt-right who have co-opted the image for their own purposes. The film premiered at the 2020 Sundance Film Festival and won a U.S. Documentary Special Jury Award for Emerging Filmmaker. It was also nominated in the U.S. Documentary Competition at Sundance.

Plot
Pepe the Frog, a character created by Matt Furie and first featured in a comic on MySpace called Boy's Club, is one of four twentysomething postcollegiate slacker friends who live together. In one installment, Pepe is caught by one of his housemates with his pants around his ankles, urinating. Asked why, he replies, "Feels good man". The image becomes a viral Internet meme and is co-opted by the alt-right.

Too late, Furie attempts to take Pepe back from the alt-right who have turned him from a cartoon character into a symbol for hate. The film deals with the question of whether Pepe can be redeemed. The coda of the film alludes to Pepe's appropriation by pro-democracy demonstrators during the 2019–2020 Hong Kong protests.

Development 
Feels Good Man is the directorial debut of Arthur Jones. Jones described the film as:

Jones, who was also film editor, finished the edit two days prior to the premiere at the Sundance Film Festival. He described the editing process as a "slow-rolling panic attack", but said he was looking forward to showing the film at the festival.

Release
As of early February 2020 the film was seeking distribution. It also appeared as part of PBS's Independent Lens. In October 2020, it was broadcast by the BBC as part of its Storyville series.

Critical response 
The film has earned critical acclaim.

The website's consensus reads, "A cautionary tale on internet culture, Feels Good Man is a compelling look at an artist's journey to salvage his creation." On Metacritic, the film has a weighted average score of 79 out of 100, based on 18 critics, indicating "generally favorable reviews".

Nick Allen of RogerEbert.com wrote: "Jones' movie is a beacon of internet literacy about a whole new language—that memes are flexible, omnipotent, and pieces of a phenomenon more powerful than their creators".

Vox Media's Polygon called it "the most important political film of 2020".

Awards and nominations 
Feels Good Man won a U.S. Documentary Special Jury Award for Emerging Filmmaker at the Sundance Film Festival. It was also nominated in the festival's U.S. Documentary Competition.

References

External links
 
Trailer
Official website

2020 directorial debut films
2020 documentary films
2020 films
2020s English-language films
Alt-right
American documentary films about politics
Documentary films about comics
Documentary films about the Internet
Sundance Film Festival award winners
Works about Internet memes
2020s American films